John Frederic Gretton, 2nd Baron Gretton OBE (15 August 1902 – 26 March 1982), was a British peer and Conservative Member of Parliament.

Gretton was the son of John Gretton, 1st Baron Gretton, and Hon. Maud Helen de Moleyns, daughter of Dayrolles Blakeney Eveleigh-de-Moleyns, 4th Baron Ventry.  Lord Gretton was educated at Eton.

He was elected to the House of Commons for Burton in 1943 (succeeding his father), a seat he held until 1945. Two years later he succeeded his father as second Baron Gretton and entered the House of Lords.

Lord Gretton married on 6 May 1930 Anna Helena, known as Margaret, elder daughter of Captain Henrik Loeffler, of 51 Grosvenor Square, London. She was a JP in 1943 for Staffordshire and lived at the Rectory, Ufford, near Stamford, Lincolnshire.

 John Henrik Gretton, 3rd Baron
 Anthony David Erik (25 Jul 1945 – 13 Nov 1982)
 Mary Ann Maud Sigrid (5 Jan 1939- )
 Elizabeth Margaret (25 Jul 1945- )

In film 

In 1958, Stapleford Miniature Railway was constructed by the 2nd Lord Gretton in Stapleford Park, as a public attraction. It also included a lion reserve. The park and house became a tourist attraction in the 1960's and '70's. It closed in 1982, and the house was sold. It was converted into a country hotel. The railway and parkland are still owned by the Gretton family, and they open for charity a few times a year.
In 1964, British Pathé filmed 'Statley Home Railway' there, which featured the 2nd. Lord.

He died in March 1982, aged 79, and was succeeded in the barony by his son John Henrik Gretton.

Arms

References

Kidd, Charles, Williamson, David (editors). Debrett's Peerage and Baronetage (1990 edition). New York: St Martin's Press, 1990.

1902 births
1982 deaths
People educated at Eton College
Barons in the Peerage of the United Kingdom
Conservative Party (UK) MPs for English constituencies
Officers of the Order of the British Empire
UK MPs 1935–1945
UK MPs who inherited peerages